This is the list of the 39 National Football League (NFL) players who have recorded at least 50 interceptions.

Players with at least 50 interceptions

See also
 List of National Football League annual interceptions leaders

Notes

References

External links
Pro-football-reference.com enumeration of career interception leaders

Interception leaders
National Football League lists